The Black Twig Pickers is an Appalachian old-time band consisting of Mike Gangloff on fiddle/banjo/jawharp/vocals; Nathan Bowles on banjo/percussion/vocals; Isak Howell on guitar/mouthharp/vocals; and Sally Anne Morgan on fiddle, flat-foot dancing, square dance calling, and vocals.  They come from Shawsville and Blacksburg in Montgomery County, Virginia and Lewisburg in Greenbrier County, West Virginia. 

The Black Twig Pickers have recorded on labels including Thrill Jockey, VHF Records Beautiful Happiness, Klang and Great Pop Supplement.

Selected discography
Friend's Peace (LP, MP3 VHF Records, 2021)
Seasonal Hire (with Steve Gunn), Thrill Jockey, 2015
Rough Carpenters, Thrill Jockey, 2013
Whompyjawed, Thrill Jockey, 2012
Yellow Cat, (7", Thrill Jockey, 2012) Thrill Jockey, 2012
Ironto Special, (CD, LP and MP3, Thrill Jockey, 2010)
Where You Gonna Be (When The Good Lord Calls You Home)? (7",  The Great Pop Supplement, 2010)
Glory In The Meeting House (with Charlie Parr) (LP, CD, House Of Mercy Recordings, 2010)
Hobo Handshake (CD, MP3, VHF Records, 2008)
Midnight Has Come And Gone (CD, MP3, VHF Records, 2005)
Soon One Morning (CD, MP3, VHF Records, 2003)
Big Banjo Blues (MP3, Klang 2002)
North Fork Flyer (CD, MP3, VHF Records, 2001)

Press and reviews
The band's 2013 album Rough Carpenters received a favorable review of 7.4 out 10 by Pitchfork Media, with critic Grayson Currin calling it "vibrant and enveloping."

References

External links
 "The Black Twig Pickers - Brushy Fork at John's Creek (Newport, VA - 4/28/12)" (video)
 "Interview: A Conversation With The Black Twig Pickers," Chris Mateer, No Depression, July 26, 2011
"Interview: The Black Twig Pickers – Nothing Funny About Days Gone By," Erin McLaughlin, Awaiting the Flood, September 2, 2010.

American folk musical groups
Musical groups from Virginia
Musical groups from West Virginia